Caraffa di Catanzaro is an Arbëreshë town and comune in the province of Catanzaro in the Calabria region of southern Italy.

References

Arbëresh settlements
Cities and towns in Calabria